The Piper Aviation Museum is an aviation museum at the William T. Piper Memorial Airport in Lock Haven, Pennsylvania. It is focused on the history of the Piper Aircraft Corporation.

History 
Originally founded in the 1980s as a part of the Lock Haven Heisey Museum, for the first ten years the museum existed in the back of a tractor trailer. The museum purchased the former Piper engineering building in 1997.

The museum opened additional exhibit space in 2022.

Aircraft on display 

 Piper J2 Cub
 Piper J3C-65 Cub
 Piper J3C-65 Cub
 Piper J4A Cub Coupe
 Piper PA-12 Super Cruiser
 Piper PA-15 Vagabond
 Piper PA-22-135 Tri-Pacer
 Piper PA-22-150 Tri-Pacer
 Piper PA-22-160 Tri-Pacer
 Piper PA-23-250 Aztec
 Piper PA-24 Comanche
 Piper PA-29 Papoose
 Piper PA-31P-350 Mojave – In storage
 Piper PA-31T Cheyenne – In storage
 Piper PA-38 Tomahawk
 Piper PA-41P Aztec
 Piper PT-1

References

External links 

 Official Website

Aerospace museums in Pennsylvania
Lock Haven, Pennsylvania
Museums in Clinton County, Pennsylvania